There have been 828 rugby league footballers who have played for the New Zealand national rugby league team since the national side started competing internationally in 1907. Players are listed according to the date of their first international test match. The below list is the official roll of honour and only lists players who have played a test match for the Kiwis or have gone away on a tour with the squad. The list does not include players who only played non-tests in New Zealand or who were unused substitutions in test matches. The New Zealand Rugby League omitted Allen Alfred St George as early records were poorly kept and it was assumed the "St George" who played for New Zealand in a 1932 test was Neville St George who debuted for New Zealand in 1928. It was however his younger brother Allen (Ed) St George. He has recently been added to the New Zealand Rugby League Roll of Honour and given the number 220a after Jonas Masters who was credited with being 220.

List of players

Dual internationals
Several of the original New Zealand team had already represented New Zealand in rugby union. This trend has continued with many players representing New Zealand in two sports or representing two different countries in rugby league due to the eligibility rules in place at the time. For example, Dally Messenger represented Australia in both rugby union and rugby league as well as playing with the 1907 touring side.

Of the 36 players that have played for both the Kiwis and the All Blacks, only Karl Ifwersen, Sonny Bill Williams, and Roger Tuivasa-Sheck have been a Kiwi before they became an All Black.

As well as the dual internationals below, Charles Savory won the New Zealand National Amateur Heavyweight Boxing championship in 1914, while Sonny Bill Williams won the New Zealand Professional Boxing Association Heavyweight Championship in 2012.

Charles Finlayson was Kiwi #100 and played for the Kiwis in 1913. Then in 1928 he played for New Zealand at cricket against Australia, although the match was not an official test match. The only player to play for New Zealand at rugby league and then an official test match in cricket for New Zealand was Verdun Scott who achieved the feat in 1939 and 1946 respectively.

Kiwi 221, Wilf Hassan became the New Zealand Diving champion in 1934 and 1935, and Kiwi captain Puti Tipene (Steve) Watene became a Member of Parliament after his retirement from rugby league.

Four Kiwis have gone on to be test referees; Albert House, Maurice Wetherill, Vic Belsham and Henry Perenara.

Gallery

Numbering
The general rule is that a player does not become a Kiwi until he actually plays in the jersey. However this rule is ignored for players who tour with the squad and do not get capped, these players still qualify as Kiwis.

Due to incomplete records, before 1939 touring teams are listed by alphabetical order and home teams are listed by position from fullback to the forwards. Post War players are listed in order of appearance.

References

External links
Roll of Honour nzrl.co.nz
Past Kiwis a-z nzrl.co.nz
Kiwis players register at nzleague.co.nz

Kiwis representatives
 
New Zealand